The Oregon Quarterly is an American alumni magazine published by the University of Oregon in Eugene, Oregon. The magazine was started in 1919 as Old Oregon.

According to the website:

Oregon Quarterly is the magazine of the University of Oregon. Four times a year, we present the diversity of ideas and people associated with the University, Oregon, and the Northwest. Just as the University of Oregon is a state and regional center for learning, teaching, research, and service, Oregon Quarterly is a state and regional magazine of good writing and important ideas.

References

External links
 Oregon Quarterly website

Alumni magazines
Quarterly magazines published in the United States
Magazines established in 1919
Magazines published in Oregon
University of Oregon
University and college mass media in Oregon